The Ohio State Buckeyes football statistical leaders are individual statistical leaders of the Ohio State Buckeyes football program in various categories, including passing, rushing, receiving, total offense, defensive stats, and kicking. Within those areas, the lists identify single-game, single-season, and career leaders. The Buckeyes represent the Ohio State University in the NCAA's Big Ten Conference.

Although Ohio State began competing in intercollegiate football in 1890, the school's official record book considers the "modern era" to have begun in 1944. Records from before this year are often incomplete and inconsistent, and they are generally not included in these lists.

These lists are dominated by more recent players for several reasons:
 Since 1944, seasons have increased from 10 games to 11 and then 12 games in length.
 The NCAA didn't allow freshmen to play varsity football until 1972 (with the exception of the World War II years), allowing players to have four-year careers.
 Due to COVID-19 issues, the NCAA ruled that the 2020 season would not count against the athletic eligibility of any football player, giving everyone who played in that season the opportunity for five years of eligibility instead of the normal four.
 The NCAA only began counting bowl games toward single-season and career statistics in 2002. The Buckeyes have played in 21 bowl games since then, giving many recent players at least one additional game to accumulate statistics. Since the current College Football Playoff was established in 2014, the Buckeyes have advanced to the CFP title game in 2014 and 2020, giving players in those seasons a second extra game to accumulate statistics. However, Ohio State's official record books included bowl games in single-season and career statistics long before the NCAA made it official policy.
 The Big Ten instituted a championship game starting in 2011, allowing the top team in each division to play another game each season. The Buckeyes have played in this game six times.
 Since former head coach Urban Meyer arrived in 2012, the Buckeyes have run a spread option offense. 2013 saw the most offensive yards in school history, and the 2014 team passed that mark. The emphasis on dual-threat quarterbacks has led to Braxton Miller and J. T. Barrett entering the leaderboards.

The Ohio State Media Guide does not include 2010 statistics for Terrelle Pryor, Dan Herron, and DeVier Posey due to NCAA sanctions, but they are reflected here.

Passing

Passing yards

Passing touchdowns

Rushing

Rushing attempts

Rushing yards

Rushing touchdowns

Receiving

Receptions

Receiving yards

Receiving touchdowns

Total offense
Total offense is the sum of passing and rushing statistics. It does not include receiving or returns.

Total offense yards

Touchdowns responsible for
"Touchdowns responsible for" is the NCAA's official term for combined passing and rushing touchdowns.

Defense

Interceptions

Tackles

Sacks

Kicking

Field goals made

Field goal percentage

Yearly

References

Lists of college football statistical leaders by team